The Midwestern Conference, alternatively Conference of Midwestern Universities, was a college athletic conference which operated in Illinois and Indiana from 1970 to 1972. It was composed of schools which had recently moved from Division II (then known as the College Division) to Division I (known as the University Division) of the National Collegiate Athletic Association (NCAA). The conference sponsored only men's sports; awarding championships in baseball, basketball, cross-country, golf, swimming, tennis, indoor & outdoor track and field, and wrestling.

The first conference championship was in cross country in the fall of 1970. Southern Illinois won that championship and almost made a clean sweep by winning championships in basketball, wrestling, swimming, baseball, tennis, and both indoor and outdoor track. Only Ball State prevented a sweep by winning the golf championship that spring.

At that time (as is generally still the case now), in order to be recognized by the NCAA, a conference was required to have six or more member institutions. The Midwestern Conference had only five members and was unable to find a sixth, so it ceased operations after only two years. The five member schools eventually affiliated with other conferences.

The conference commissioner was Jack McClelland, the former Drake Bulldogs basketball coach and athletic director, who had resigned as commissioner of the North Central Conference in order to accept the position with the Midwestern Conference.

Member schools
The onetime members of the Midwestern Conference and the conferences they later joined are:
 Ball State University Cardinals — Mid-American Conference, 1973 to present 
 Illinois State University Redbirds — Missouri Valley Conference, 1981 to present 
 Indiana State University Sycamores — Missouri Valley Conference, 1976 to present 
 Northern Illinois University Huskies —Mid-American Conference, 1977 to 1986, 1997 to present 
 Southern Illinois University Salukis — Missouri Valley Conference, 1975 to present

Conference champions

Baseball
 1971 Southern Illinois
 1972 Northern Illinois

Basketball
 1970–71 Southern Illinois
 1971–72 Northern Illinois

Cross country
 1970 Southern Illinois
 1971 ?

Golf
 1971 Ball State
 1972 Ball State

Swimming
1970–71 Southern Illinois
1971–72 Southern Illinois?

Tennis
 1971 Southern Illinois
 1972 Southern Illinois

Indoor track & field
 1970–71 Southern Illinois
 1971–72 Northern Illinois

Outdoor track & field
 1971 Southern Illinois
 1972 Illinois State?

Wrestling
 1970–71 Southern Illinois
 1971–72 Northern Illinois

References

 
Sports in the Midwestern United States
Sports organizations established in 1970
Organizations disestablished in 1972